Meet Maxwell Archer is a 1940 British mystery film directed by John Paddy Carstairs and starring John Loder, Leueen MacGrath and Athole Stewart. The screenplay concerns a private detective who attempts to clear a man wrongly accused of murder. The film was based on the 1938 novel by Hugh Clevely. It was released in the U.S. in 1942 as Maxwell Archer, Detective.

Plot summary
Maxwell Archer, a private detective, attempts to clear a young man wrongly accused of murder.

Cast
 John Loder as Maxwell Archer
 Leueen MacGrath as Sarah
 Athole Stewart as Superintendent Gordon
 Marta Labarr as Nina
 George Merritt as Inspector Cornell
 Ronald Adam as Nicolides
 Peter Hobbes as George Gull Jr.
 Ralph Roberts as George Gull Sr.
 Syd Crossley as Perkins
 Barbara Everest as Miss Duke

Critical reception
The film was coldly received. TV Guide wrote, "Oh where is Sherlock Holmes when you need him? Poorly made with a dopey script that gives the actors little room to breathe, let alone act."

References

External links

1940 films
British mystery films
Films directed by John Paddy Carstairs
British black-and-white films
1940 mystery films
Films shot at Rock Studios
1940s English-language films
1940s British films